Skam France (also called Skam Belgique; often stylized as SKAM) is a French-Belgian teen drama television series broadcast by France.tv Slash that follows the lives of teenagers in Paris. It was a French adaptation of the popular Norwegian series SKAM.

Concept
SKAM France was based on the Norwegian series SKAM, created by Julie Andem, which follows the daily life of high school students and the problems that they face. The plot of each season focuses around a different central character and particular themes. Each adaptation of the original series follows a similar storyline, with the first season focusing on Emma Borgès (the counterpart of SKAM's Eva Kviig Mohn), the second on Manon Demissy (the counterpart of Noora Amalie Sætre), the third on Lucas Lallement (the counterpart of Isak Valtersen), and the fourth on Imane Bakhellal (the counterpart of Sana Bakkoush). The fifth, sixth, seventh, eighth, ninth, and tenth seasons of SKAM France (centering around the characters of Arthur Broussard, Lola Lecomte, Tiffany Prigent, Bilal Cherif, Maya Etienne, and Anaïs Rocha) are not based on the original series.

The series was aired via short clips published on the Internet in real-time which are compiled to form a longer episode at the end of each week. Characters also have in-universe Instagram accounts where text conversations are published.

Cast and characters

Seasons

Season 1
Season 1 aired from 9 February to 6 April 2018 and comprised 9 episodes. Emma Borgès is the central character and the season focuses on her relationship with her boyfriend Yann as well as themes of cyberbullying and friendship.

Season 2
Season 2 aired from 13 April to 22 June 2018 and comprised 13 episodes. Manon Demissy is the central character and the season focuses on her relationship with Charles, a popular boy at school, and themes of sexual abuse.

Season 3
Season 3 aired from 25 January to 29 March 2019 and comprised 10 episodes. Lucas Lallemant is the central character, and the season deals with his homosexuality, coming out, and his relationship with Eliott, who is later revealed to be suffering from bipolar disorder, another major theme of the season.

Season 4
Season 4 aired from 5 April to 4 June 2019 and comprised 10 episodes. It centers around Imane Bakhellal and themes of faith and racism. It was reported that Assa Sylla, who played Imane, was the first black Muslim woman to lead a French television series.

Season 5
Season 5 aired from 10 January to 6 March 2020 and comprised 10 episodes. Arthur Broussard is the main character and the series deals with themes of deafness, invisible disability and ableism.

Season 6
Season 6 aired from 24 April to 26 June 2020 and comprised 10 episodes. It centers around Lola Lecomte and problems of addiction and self-destructive behavior.

In the final episode of season 5, the audience finds out that Lola is the younger sister of Daphne, who is a part of the original cast. Lola and Daphne are estranged siblings who are dealing with their mother's death in different ways. While Daphne is joyful and seemingly happy, Lola is the complete opposite with her unenthusiastic dark attitude. After their mother's death, the two sisters learn how to cooperate and build their bond again. Although it is a struggle at first for Lola to trust Daphne, they eventually end up being supportive siblings. Daphne supports Lola with her fight for sobriety and Lola supports Daphne with her eating disorders. Despite this season focusing heavily on familial reconnection, it also focuses on love and friendships. It is during this season that the audience is introduced to the "La Mif" which is Lola's friend group.

During this season the group included, Maya Etienne (Lola's love interest), Jo Benezra, Max Bernini, and Sekou. They each have something to bring to the table and show Lola to be herself while having fun attending parties or urbex exploring. Lola also develops a strong bond with Eliott Demaury who is introduced in season 3 as Lucas Lallement's love interest and later boyfriend. Even though, they met in the first episode of season 6, the two officially start growing closer in episode four, "La descente". Elliot can relate to Lola in the aspect of not being perfect as he has suffered from his own problems in the past and has not so proudly turned to alcohol and weed for comfort. Lola feels comfortable with Elliot which in turn creates a connection between them as she feels he's a mentor and good friend to her. Throughout the season, the audience is taken on a journey through the eyes of Lola and her battle with self-hatred, drug addiction, love, and friendship. Moreover, this season is the first of the "new" generation as the focus shifts on younger students than the original cast.

Season 7 
Season 7 began on 22 January 2021 and ended on 19 March 2021. Tiffany Prigent is the central character and the series deals with issues of teen pregnancy, as well as pregnancy denial.

Season 8
Season 8 began on 7 May 2021 and ended on 9 July 2021. The central character is Bilal Cherif, who struggles with issues of homelessness and food insecurity, while juggling a relationship with Jo Benezra, who has just been diagnosed with HIV.

Season 9
Season 9 aired from 14 January 2022 to 18 March 2022, centering around Maya Etienne. Maya and her long-time girlfriend, Lola, break up, causing Maya to reevaluate her life and confront feelings she has buried since the death of her parents when she was young.

Season 10
On 19 March 2022, it was confirmed that season 10 will be centered around Anaïs Rocha and the themes of rape and feminism. The season began airing on 13 May 2022 and finished airing on 2 July 2022.

References

2010s French drama television series
2020s French drama television series
2010s Belgian television series
2020s Belgian television series
2010s LGBT-related drama television series
2010s teen drama television series
2020s teen drama television series
2018 French television series debuts
2018 Belgian television series debuts
Television series about Islam
Television series about teenagers
French-language television shows
Television shows set in Paris
Television shows about disability
Teenage pregnancy in television
La Trois original programming